Vanilla Fudge (Atco 33-224/mono, SD 33-224/stereo) is the debut studio album by the American psychedelic rock band Vanilla Fudge. Released in summer 1967, it consists entirely of half-speed covers and three short original instrumental compositions.

The album was Vanilla Fudge's most successful, peaking at #6 on the Billboard album charts and number #8 in Finland in November 1967. Parts of the original stereo LP were actually mixed in mono, including the entire track "You Keep Me Hangin' On". An edited version of "You Keep Me Hangin' On" was released as a single and also charted.

Reception

Allmusic's Paul Collins retrospectively rated Vanilla Fudge four out of five stars. He stated that "nobody could accuse Vanilla Fudge of bad taste in their repertoire" and that most of the tracks "share a common structure of a disjointed warm-up jam, a Hammond-heavy dirge of harmonized vocals at the center, and a final flat-out jam." However, he also said that "each song still works as a time capsule of American psychedelia."

Track listing

Side 1 of the album ends with: "The following is a series of high-frequency tones..."

CD reissues have a modified track listing for the tracks on side 2 of the LP:

The text in all uppercase letters in the CD reissue track listing spells out "STRAWBERRYFIELDS".

Personnel
Carmine Appice — drums, vocals
Tim Bogert — bass, vocals
Vince Martell — guitar, vocals
Mark Stein — lead vocals, keyboards

References

The Allmusic review is of the 2002 album of the same name rather than of the original 1967 LP.

Vanilla Fudge albums
1967 debut albums
Atco Records albums
Polydor Records albums
Albums produced by Shadow Morton